Andrew McFarlane (21 June 1899 – 14 June 1972) was an Irish cricketer.  McFarlane was a right-handed batsman who bowled right-arm off break.  He was born at Sion Mills, United Kingdom (today Northern Ireland).  He was educated at the Sion Mills Public Elementary School.

Following success in club cricket, McFarlane was selected to play in Ireland's first-class match against Scotland in 1937 at Ormeau, Belfast.  Batting at number six, he was dismissed for a duck by John Farquhar in the Irish first-innings.  In their second-innings he scored 21 runs before being dismissed by Alexander Paris.  This was his only major appearance for Ireland.

Outside of cricket he was employed as a textile worker.  He died at Derry, Northern Ireland on 14 June 1972.

References

External links
Andy McFarlane at ESPNcricinfo
Andy McFarlane at CricketArchive

1899 births
1972 deaths
Sportspeople from County Tyrone
Irish cricketers
Cricketers from Northern Ireland
Textile workers